The Xiong'an–Xinzhou high-speed railway or Xiongxin HSR is a  long high-speed railway under construction between Xiong'an in Hebei province and Xinzhou in Shanxi province, China. It will connect to the Datong–Xi'an high-speed railway. The railway will form part of the Beijing–Kunming corridor of the 8+8 HSR Grid. Construction started on 1 October 2022.

Stations

References 

High-speed railway lines in China